2010 Summer Tour is an EP that features the American rock band Paramore, Canadian indie rock band Tegan and Sara, American rock band New Found Glory, and Swedish band Kadawatha. The EP was sold during the 2010 Honda Civic Tour and the remaining dates of Paramore's Brand New Eyes World Tour.

Track listing

Personnel

Paramore
 Hayley Williams - lead vocals
 Josh Farro - guitar, backing vocals
 Taylor York - guitar
 Jeremy Davis - bass
 Zac Farro - drums

Tegan and Sara
 Tegan Quinn - vocals, guitar, keyboards 
 Sara Quinn - vocals, guitar, keyboards 
 Ted Gowans - guitar, keyboards 
 Shaun Huberts - bass
 Johnny Andrews - drums

New Found Glory
 Jordan Pundik - lead vocals
 Chad Gilbert - lead guitar, backing vocals
 Steve Klein - rhythm guitar
 Ian Grushka - bass
 Cyrus Bolooki - drums

Kadawatha
 Daniel Kadawatha - vocals

References

External links
The Paramore Webstore

2010 EPs
Paramore EPs
Fueled by Ramen EPs